Jurica Vranješ (born 31 January 1980) is a Croatian former professional footballer. He was described as versatile midfielder, playing both as a defensive and a central midfielder, noted for his tackling and passing abilities.

Club career
Vranješ was born in Osijek, Croatia. He started playing in NK Osijek where he played between 1997 and 1999. Some websites say Vranješ started his career at FK Vojvodina, but Vranješ himself explained how those websites confused their statistics with another player, Mićo Vranješ, playing back then in Vojvodina. 

After playing with Osijek in the Prva HNL, he then moved to Bayer Leverkusen where he played three seasons until moving to VfB Stuttgart in 2003 and finally to Werder Bremen in 2005. In August 2009 Werder Bremen announced that he could leave the club. On 29 January 2010, he left Werder Bremen and was loaned to Gençlerbirliği for the rest of the season.

In September 2011, Vranješ joined Aris Saloniki He made his debut in the yellow jersey against Olympiacos. His contract was terminated on 10 January 2012. In May 2012, he joined Rijeka in Croatia, where he played six games before his contract with the club was terminated in November 2012.

International career
Vranješ made his debut for Croatia in a June 1999 Korea Cup match against Egypt and earned a total of 26 caps, scoring no goals. He was part of the national team squad at the 2002 FIFA World Cup, where he played in two games. He also played in the Croatian team at the 1998 Under-18 European Championship when Croatia won the third place. His final international was an October 2007 friendly match against Slovakia.

Career statistics

Club

International

Honours
Osijek
 Croatian Cup: 1999

Bayer Leverkusen
 Bundesliga runner-up: 1999–00 2001–02
 DFB-Pokal runner-up: 2002
 UEFA Champions League runner-up: 2001–02

Werder Bremen
 Bundesliga runner-up: 2005–06, 2007–08
 DFB-Pokal: 2009
 DFL-Ligapokal: 2006
 DFL-Supercup: 2009
 UEFA Cup runner-up: 2008–09

Individual
Croatian Footballer Hope of the Year: 1998

References

External links
 

1980 births
Living people
Sportspeople from Osijek
Association football midfielders
Croatian footballers
Croatia youth international footballers
Croatia under-21 international footballers
Croatia international footballers
2002 FIFA World Cup players
2006 FIFA World Cup players
NK Osijek players
Bayer 04 Leverkusen players
VfB Stuttgart players
SV Werder Bremen players
Gençlerbirliği S.K. footballers
Aris Thessaloniki F.C. players
HNK Rijeka players
Croatian Football League players
Bundesliga players
Regionalliga players
Süper Lig players
Super League Greece players
Croatian expatriate footballers
Expatriate footballers in Germany
Expatriate footballers in Turkey
Expatriate footballers in Greece
Croatian expatriate sportspeople in Germany
Croatian expatriate sportspeople in Turkey
Croatian expatriate sportspeople in Greece